The Edgar class were nine first-class protected cruisers built for the Royal Navy under the of Naval Defence Act 1889. The class gave long service and all of the ships participated in the First World War. One, was lost during the war, with the other eight being scrapped in the 1920s.

Design

Nine new first-class cruisers were required by the Naval Defence Act. Although the Blake-class cruisers were impressive ships and powerful, they were too large and expensive to simply repeat en masse.

The new ships were envisioned as reduced version of Blake and Blenheim, retaining the same main armament of two 9.2-inch BL guns ten 6-inch QF guns. The 9.2-inch pieces were mounted singly on the centreline at either end of the upper deck, on turntable mountings provided with heavily-armoured open-backed gunshields which resembled turrets. The 6-inch battery was divided between two decks on each beam, with six upper deck guns (three on each beam) and four on the main deck, two to a beam. The main deck guns were in casemates, while the six upper deck guns were protected only by shields. For close-range defence against torpedo boats there were 12 QF 6-pounder Hotchkiss guns and four QF 3-pounder Hotchkiss guns. Armament was completed with four 18-inch torpedo tubes.

Displacement was reduced by 1,800 tons from Blake, length between perpendiculars by 15 feet. Propulsion came from steam expansion engines, driving two shafts. With funnels as tall as the Blake class, the Edgars appeared stockier than the preceding ships. Despite this, slimming their beam by 5 feet, slightly reducing draught and providing highly reliable 12,000 ihp machinery (compared with the previous troublesome 13,000 ihp installation) meant the new ships would practically match their two larger predecessors' steaming performance. 

The conning tower had  armour. Four of the Edgar class were fitted with anti-torpedo bulge during refit in 1914.

Crescent and Royal Arthur were intended to operate as flagships for cruiser squadrons on foreign stations. They were built to a slightly modified design and are sometimes considered a separate class. In order to accommodate the additional flag officers and staff in the forward part of the ship, they had a forecastle one deck higher than their other sisters'. This additional weight forwards was balanced by the deletion of the forward 9.2-inch gun and its very heavy armoured gunshield, with sufficient weight allowance remaining afterwards for two additional 6-inch guns to be placed, sided, atop the forecastle in light open-backed shields.

Building programme

The following table gives the build details and purchase cost of the members of the Edgar class.  Standard British practice at that time was for these costs to exclude armament and stores.

Notes

References

 Brassey, Lord (ed) Brassey's The Naval Annual 1888-89
 Brassey, T.A. (ed) Brassey's The Naval Annual 1890
 Brassey, T.A. (ed) Brassey's The Naval Annual 1891
 Brassey, T.A. (ed) Brassey's The Naval Annual 1892
 Brassey, T.A. (ed) Brassey's The Naval Annual 1893
 Brassey, T.A. (ed) Brassey's The Naval Annual 1894
 Brassey, T.A. (ed) Brassey's The Naval Annual 1895
 Brassey, T.A. (ed) Brassey's The Naval Annual 1896
 Brassey, T.A. (ed) Brassey's The Naval Annual 1899
 Brassey, T.A. (ed) Brassey's The Naval Annual 1902
 Brassey, T.A. (ed) Brassey's The Naval Annual 1903
 Brassey, T.A. (ed) Brassey's The Naval Annual 1904
 Brassey, T.A. (ed) Brassey's The Naval Annual 1905
 Leyland, J. and Brassey, T.A. (ed) The Naval Annual 1906

External links

www.worldwar1.co.uk

Cruiser classes
 
Ship classes of the Royal Navy